Star Trek: The Music is conducted by Erich Kunzel of the Cincinnati Pops Orchestra, and hosted/narrated by John de Lancie (Q from The Next Generation, Deep Space Nine and Voyager) and Robert Picardo (The Doctor from Voyager, and Dr. Zimmerman in various episodes of DS9 and VOY).

First set 
 Alexander Courage – Suite from "The Menagerie"
 Alexander Courage – Main Theme from "Star Trek" (TV Series)
 Jerry Goldsmith – Main Theme from "Star Trek: The Motion Picture"
 Jerry Goldsmith – Klingon Battle from "Star Trek: The Motion Picture"
 James Horner – Main Title from "Star Trek II: The Wrath of Khan"
 James Horner – Epilogue from "Star Trek II: The Wrath of Khan"
 James Horner – End Credits from "Star Trek II: The Wrath of Khan"
 James Horner – Main Theme from "Star Trek III: The Search for Spock"
 Leonard Rosenman – Main Title from "Star Trek IV: The Voyage Home"

Second set 
 Dennis McCarthy/arr. Reineke – Main Theme from "Star Trek: The Next Generation"
 Jerry Goldsmith – A Busy Man from "Star Trek V: The Final Frontier"
 Cliff Eidelman – End Title from "Star Trek VI: The Undiscovered Country"
 Dennis McCarthy/arr. Reineke – Main Theme from "Star Trek: Deep Space Nine"
 Dennis McCarthy/arr. McKenzie – End Title from "Star Trek Generations"
 Jerry Goldsmith/arr. Mann – Main Theme from "Star Trek: Voyager"

Dates/locations 
Star Trek: The Music had its original performances in Dallas, Texas on Tuesday, June 5, 2007 and Wednesday, June 6, 2007 at the Meyerson Symphony Center.

The second show was performed on June 20 and June 21, 2008 at The Roy Thomson Hall in Toronto, Ontario by the Toronto Symphony Orchestra.

The third show was in Cincinnati, Ohio on June 28, 2008,

The fourth show was in Denver, Colorado on November 1, 2008.

The fifth show was in Calgary, Alberta on January 13 to 15, 2010.

There were two shows in Kitchener, Ontario on June 2 and 3, 2010 at The Centre In The Square by the Kitchener-Waterloo Symphony.

Photos

Toronto

See also
 Star Trek: The Ultimate Voyage

External links
 ST-themusic.net

References 

  Toronto Sun
  TrekToday

Music based on Star Trek